Franck Chambilly (born 3 September 1970) is a French judoka.

Achievements

References

1970 births
Living people
French male judoka
Judoka at the 1996 Summer Olympics
Olympic judoka of France
Mediterranean Games silver medalists for France
Mediterranean Games medalists in judo
Competitors at the 1993 Mediterranean Games
20th-century French people
21st-century French people